JHSF Participações is a Brazilian real estate holding company. It is known as the first company in Brazil to prioritize recurrent income assets, including shopping malls, airports, hotels and other real estate projects. The company operates in the Brazilian market, as well as in other countries, such as the United States and Uruguay. In 2020, the company had a market value of approximately R$5,2 billion.

History
The company was founded under the name JHS in São Paulo, Brazil in 1972 by brothers Fábio and José Roberto Auriemo and two other partners. The company focused on construction and real estate development at its inception. By 1990, JHS had split into two companies with Fábio Auriemo taking control of real estate market operations (JHSF Participações), and José Roberto Auriemo heading the other company (JHSJ).

In 2001, JHSF Participações expanded its business into the shopping center segment. The company developed the Shopping Metrô Santa Cruz in São Paulo, Brazil, which was the first mall in the country to have a subway station.

The company also became the majority shareholder of Fasano Group's hotels at that time.

JHSF negotiated for Shopping Metrô Santa Cruz to be to sold to BR Malls in 2010. By 2016, Hemisfério Sul Investimentos Group had concluded the purchase of Shopping Metrô Tucuruvi. In 2014, JHSF inaugurated Catarina Fashion Outlet, the first outlet in Brazil in the luxury market. The mall is part of a project that includes São Paulo Catarina Executive Airport, the first private airport for executive aviation in the country. In the same year, Vice President Eduardo Camara took over as CEO and José Auriemo Neto became its chairman of the board of directors.

Camara remained in office until February 2018, when he was replaced by Thiago Alonso de Oliveira. In addition to managing director, Oliveira has accumulated the positions of chief financial officer, director of investor relations and member of the company's board of directors.

By 2017, JHSF had developed more than 6 million square meters of real estate projects.

Projects
JHSF Internacional has developed projects in the United States and Uruguay. The company's most notable buildings are 815 on Fifth Avenue in New York City and the real estate development of the residential condominium Las Piedras in Punta del Este, Uruguay.

JHSF launched the Cidade Jardim complex in 2006, which includes the Shopping Cidade Jardim. In addition to the shopping mall, the complex consists of nine residential towers that are 
part of the high-end condominium Parque Cidade Jardim, and three commercial towers that make up the Cidade Jardim Corporate Center.

In December 2019, JHSF opened São Paulo Catarina Executive Airport, Brazil's first private airport, dedicated to executive flights. Located in the city of São Roque, in the interior of São Paulo, the project has a capacity for 200 thousand landings and takeoffs per year, and was built in an area of 5.2 million square meters.

External links

References

Holding companies of Brazil
Real estate companies of Brazil
Brazilian brands